Yakatarla is a name given to villages in Turkey.

Yakatarla may also refer to:

 Yakatarla, Gülşehir, Village in Nevşehir.
 Yakatarla, Ovacık, Village in Tunceli